"Harmony" is a song written by Jimbeau Hinson and Rick Ellsworth, and recorded by American country music artist John Conlee.  It was released in February 1986 as the first single and title track from the album Harmony.  The song reached #10 on the Billboard Hot Country Singles & Tracks chart.

Chart performance

References

1986 singles
1986 songs
John Conlee songs
Columbia Records singles
Songs written by Jimbeau Hinson